Stefan Demert (15 December 1939 – 9 July 2018) was a Swedish singer and songwriter.

Demert was born in Nyköping. His debut album was Visor för smutsiga öron ("Songs for dirty ears") in 1970, which was certified gold, as was his second album, Marsch på er alla pannkakor.

His best-known songs include ”Balladen om den kaxiga myran”, ”Till SJ”, and ”Anna Anaconda” in which he sang together with his common law wife at the time, actress and singer Jeja Sundström. Several of his songs charted on Svensktoppen in the 1970s. Demert, Sundström, Sid Jansson and Björn Ståbi formed the group Visor & bockfot which toured Sweden, performing in folkparker around the country.

Demert received the Nils Ferlin Award in 2000 and the Ulf Peder Olrog Prize in 2004.

Discography
 1970 – Visor för smutsiga öron
 1971 – Marsch på er alla pannkakor
 1973 – Den siste ornitologen
 1975 – Jeja & Stefan, with Jeja Sundström
 1978 – Sidensammetrasalump, with Jeja Sundström
 1981 – Till Anna, with Jeja Sundström
 1985 – En afton i Ulvesund - Ord och inga visor
 1993 – Katten och andra visor
 2006 – 20 bästa
 2014 – Till Carina

References

1939 births
2018 deaths
Swedish male singer-songwriters
Swedish singer-songwriters
People from Nyköping Municipality